Makiko Futaki (二木真希子 Futaki Makiko, June 19, 1958 – May 13, 2016) was a Japanese animator best known for her contributions to Studio Ghibli on films such as My Neighbor Totoro (1988), Princess Mononoke (1997), and Spirited Away (2001).  She is also known for her role as a key animator on the cult classic film, Akira (1988), and her early work with studio Gainax on Royal Space Force: The Wings of Honnêamise (1987). Hayao Miyazaki, the founder of Studio Ghibli, praised her talents as an artist calling her both a valuable asset and someone he can trust to execute his vision. She died on May 13, 2016, due to an unknown illness at a Tokyo hospital.

Career 
In college, Futaki began to gain recognition as an animator for the cine-calligraphy style films she presented at the amateur PAF Animation Festival. Cine-calligraphy is a technique initially developed by Norman McLaren, which involved scratching images directly onto the film stock. In the case of Futaki, this was done by drawing on 8-millimeter film. Despite her young age, this demonstrated great artistic vision and talent as an animator.

She began with a minor role doing in-between animation on Hayao Miyazaki's directorial debut film, Lupin the III: The Castle of Cagliostro, in 1979. However, it was not until she met Isao Takahata, co-founder of Studio Ghibli, and impressed him with her work on Jarinko Chie that she would be recruited by the studio in 1981. She continued by doing partial work on most of the first few Studio Ghibli movies while still working on other feature projects with different studios. Her work as a key animator on Akira, which received critical acclaim both nationally and internationally, is what prompted Miyazaki to adopt her as a full-time staff member. She had worked on every single Ghibli film since 1998 with her final contribution being on 2014's When Marnie Was There.

Artistic style and influences
Futaki expressed a particular interest in nature as well as an empathy for animals, and this has been reflected in her animation style. As a key animator, she was tasked with creating detailed frames of climactic moments for in-between animators to use later as a basis to structure the scene. This also included drawing facial expressions and choreographing complex action scenes. She was responsible for animating scenes, such as the meeting between Mei and Totoro in My Neighbor Totoro, the rooftop meeting between Pazu and Sheeta in Castle in the Sky, and the opening scene in Kiki's Delivery Service. While she specialized in, and excelled at drawing scenes of natural harmony with Ghibli, she also showed adaptability in her style notably with her role in creating the Cyberpunk world of Akira.

Despite her talents, there have also been various barriers that kept Futaki from working extensively within the animation industry. Some of this can be attributed to the traditional expectations of women in Japan and how this limits the opportunities offered to them in this medium. Additionally, Futaki's particularly time-consuming and detailed approach to drawing frames, as well as her niche drawing specialty, has excluded her from the faster-paced animation industry. Miyazaki further commented on the obstacles she faced in the Japanese animation industry.

"Unfortunately there are not many avenues for Futaki-san to express her talent in Japan's present animation world. Depiction of plants are easy to avoid. Also, the piecework payment structure that is set at so much per second makes it difficult for her to be fairly compensated for her efforts"

Work outside of film
Miyazaki stated that he is normally opposed to having his animators take on side projects while working on a film. However, he also noted that he makes an exception with Futaki. He actively encouraged her to pursue different mediums. He further stated that "this is because I don't think her sweeping and deep interest in the world and in living beings can be expressed truly through animation." Despite this encouragement, Futaki has kept her work outside of the animation medium to a minimum.

The Tree in the Middle of the World (1989)

A children book written and illustrated exclusively by Futaki and inspired by her trip to Yakushima when she was doing research for My Neighbor Totoro. It follows the story of a young girl named Cici and her quest to climb the great tree. This book took over a year to complete because of her commitments to other films and has yet to be released outside of Japan.; except for the italian edition released at the end of 2020.

Moribito series (1996–2012)

Futaki was one of three artists, along with Miho Satake and Yuko Shimizu, that provided illustrations for Moribito. a fantasy novel series by Japanese author Nahoko Uehashi. The series follows Balsa, a bodyguard for hire, who saves a young boy from the river and has her destiny intertwine with his. The series has received praise for its mix of both Western modes of storytelling and Japanese history.

Filmography

References

External links

1958 births
2016 deaths
Japanese animators
Japanese women animators
Japanese women artists
Aichi University of Education alumni
Akira (franchise)